Edenderry may refer to the following:

Edenderry, County Down, a small village south of Belfast, Northern Ireland
Edenderry, County Armagh, a townland in County Armagh, Northern Ireland
Edenderry, County Offaly, a town in the Republic of Ireland.
Edenderry, County Tyrone, a small village in Northern Ireland.